The Forever Changes Concert (2003) is the last album released by Love with Arthur Lee. There was a two-CD re-release in 2007 under the name of The Forever Changes Concert & More, which features extra songs, a live video of "Alone Again Or", band images and a screensaver.

2003 track listing
"Alone Again Or" (Maclean,  – 4:19)
"A House Is Not a Motel" (Lee,  – 4:08)
"Andmoreagain" (Lee,  – 4:04)
"The Daily Planet" (Lee,  – 3:42)
"Old Man" (Maclean,  – 3:39)
"The Red Telephone" (Lee,  – 7:12)
"Maybe the People Would Be the Times or Between Clark and Hilldale" (Lee,  – 3:57)
"Live and Let Live" (Lee,  – 5:13)
"The Good Humor Man He Sees Everything Like This" (Lee,  – 3:42)
"Bummer in the Summer" (Lee,  – 2:34)
"You Set the Scene" (Lee,  – 7:40)

Bonus tracks
"7 and 7 Is" (Lee,  – 2:51)
"Your Mind and We Belong Together" (Lee,  – 4:11)
"Orange Skies" (MacLean,  – 3:09)
"She Comes in Colors" (Lee,  – 3:00)
"Listen to my Song" (Lee,  – 2:03)
"August" (Lee,  – 5:34)

2007 track listing

Disc 1
"Alone Again Or" (Maclean,  – 4:19)
"A House Is Not a Motel" (Lee,  – 4:08)
"Andmoreagain" (Lee,  – 4:04)
"The Daily Planet" (Lee,  – 3:42)
"Old Man" (Maclean,  – 3:39)
"The Red Telephone" (Lee,  – 7:12)
"Maybe the People Would Be the Times or Between Clark and Hilldale" (Lee,  – 3:57)
"Live and Let Live" (Lee,  – 5:13)
"The Good Humor Man He Sees Everything Like This" (Lee,  – 3:42)
"Bummer in the Summer" (Lee,  – 2:34)
"You Set the Scene" (Lee,  – 7:40)

Disc 2
"Orange Skies" (MacLean,  – 3:09)
"She Comes in Colors" (Lee,  – 3:00)
"Listen to My Song" (Lee,  – 2:03)
"August" (Lee,  – 5:34)
"7 and 7 Is" (Lee,  – 2:51)
"Your Mind and We Belong Together" (Lee,  – 4:11)
"Signed D.C." (Lee, – 6:49)
"My Little Red Book" (Burt Bacharach, Hal David, – 2:33)

References

Love (band) albums
2003 live albums
2007 live albums
Albums produced by Arthur Lee (musician)